Forests of the Night is a 1963 novel from Australian author Jon Cleary. It is about a British plastic surgeon who visits his father in Burma and gets involved with a Catholic missionary, a killer tiger and a local rebel leader.

Cleary visited Burma as part of his research.

At one stage there were plans to make a film version with Dirk Bogarde but this did not eventuate.

References

External links
Forests of the Night at AustLit (subscription required)

1963 Australian novels
Novels set in Myanmar
William Collins, Sons books
William Morrow and Company books
Novels by Jon Cleary